Etienne Verveer (born 12 September 1968) is a Dutch former professional footballer.

Verveer has played his football across several countries including Netherlands, Switzerland, England, Scotland and Italy.

External links

1968 births
Living people
Sportspeople from Paramaribo
Surinamese emigrants to the Netherlands
Dutch footballers
Dutch expatriate footballers
Millwall F.C. players
Bradford City A.F.C. players
Aberdeen F.C. players
English Football League players
Association football midfielders
S.S. Ischia Isolaverde players